The 1900 Challenge Cup was the 4th staging of rugby league's oldest knockout competition, the Challenge Cup.

The final was contested by Swinton and Salford at Fallowfield Stadium in Manchester  on Saturday 28 April 1900. Swinton won 16–8 in front of a crowd of 17,864. The cup was presented by Mrs Smith, wife of the President of the Northern Union.

First round
The 30 ties of the first round were all played on Saturday 17 March 1900.  64 teams had been in the draw but Holbeck and Bramley received byes as their opponents, Whitehaven Town and Rothwell respectively withdrew from the competition before the games were played.

The two drawn matches were replayed on Tuesday 20 March; Batley beat Castleford 5–0 and Oldham beat Manningham 18–3.

Second round
The second-round games were played on Saturday 24 March 1900.

Third round
The third round matches were played on Saturday 31 March 1900.

The Widnes v Bramley tie was replayed on Tuesday 3 April with Widnes winning 8–0.  Runcorn and Bradford replayed their game the following evening and drew again, this time 3–3.  With the quarter-finals to be played on the following Saturday, the two clubs had to play a second replay on the following, Thursday, evening. In this third meeting Runcorn came out on top 6–2 in a match played on neutral ground at Broughton Rovers.

Quarter-finals
Saturday 7 April 1900 saw the four quarter final games played.

Leeds parish Church and Runcorn replayed the match on 11 April and Leeds Parish Church won 8–6.

Semifinals
The semi finals were played on 14 April 1900

Final

Notes

References

External links
Challenge Cup official website 
Challenge Cup 1899/1900 results at Rugby League Project
The Heritage Numbers - Part 2 at Swinton Lions official website

Challenge Cup
Challenge Cup